Triglinae is a subfamily of demersal, marine ray-finned fishes, part of the family Triglidae, the gurnards and searobins. These gurnards are found in all the tropical and temperate oceans of the world except for the Western Atlantic Ocean.

Taxonomy
Triglinae was named in 1815 by the French polymath Constantine Samuel  Rafinesque and is one of 3 subfamilies in the family Triglidae, part of the suborder Platycephaloidei within the order Scorpaeniformes. This subfamily is regarded as most derived of the 3 subfamilies in Triglidae, with Prionotinae being the basal and Pterygotriglinae being less derived than Triglinae.

Etymology
Triglinae, like the family name, is based on that of Linneaus's genus Trigla, the name of which is a classical name for the red mullet (Mullus barbatus), Artedi thought the red mullet and the gurnards were the same as fishes from both taxa are known to create sounds taken out of the water as well as being red in colour. Linnaeus realised they were different and classified Trigla as a gurnard, in contradiction of the ancient usage. Their common name, gurnard, was given to them because when caught, they make a croaking noise similar to a frog, which has given them the onomatopoeic name gurnard.

Genera
The following four genera are classified within the subfamily Triglinae.

 Chelidonichthys Kaup, 1873
 Eutrigla Fraser-Brunner, 1938
 Lepidotrigla Günther, 1860
 Trigla Linnaeus, 1758

Characteristics
Triglinae gurnards have all the tips of the lower pterygiophores widened and exposed at the bases of both the first and second dorsal fins, There is no basihyal and the lateral line forks into two on the caudal fin. They have a vertebral count of between 29 and 35.

Distribution
Triglinae gurnards are widely distributed in the temperate and tropical seas around the world, although they are absent from the Western Atlantic Ocean.

References

Triglidae
Taxa named by Constantine Samuel Rafinesque
Fish subfamilies